Xylophanes kiefferi is a moth of the  family Sphingidae. It is known from Colombia.

Description
It is similar to Xylophanes aristor, but more robust, the outer edge of the forewing is straighter, the forewing upperside ground colour is deep rich brown and the first and fourth postmedian lines are farther apart. The upperside of the body is deep rich brown. The forewing underside is brown, although the basal area is dark brown grey. The second postmedian line is heavy, sinuate and continuous, reaching the inner margin. The dark marginal area is relatively close to the postmedian area and is delineated by a grey line that is partly toothed. The anal area of the hindwing underside is bright yellow.

Adults are probably on wing year-round.

The larvae probably feed on Rubiaceae and Malvaceae species.

References

kiefferi
Moths described in 1995
Endemic fauna of Colombia
Moths of South America